Schiller is a surname of German origin.

People
Notable people with this surname include the following:

Adrian Schiller (born 1964), British actor
Bob Schiller (1918–2017), American screenwriter
Bob Schiller (ice hockey) (born 1933), Canadian ice hockey player
Charlotte von Schiller (1766–1826), Friedrich Schiller's wife
Christian Schiller (1895–1976), HM Inspector of Schools in the United Kingdom and a promoter of progressive education
Dawn Schiller, memoirist and former underaged girlfriend of pornographic actor John Holmes
Eric Schiller (born 1955), chess player and linguist
Fabian Schiller (born 1997), German racing driver
Fanny Schiller (1901-1971), Mexican actress
F. C. S. Schiller (1864–1937), British pragmatist/humanist philosopher of the early 20th century
Frederick Schiller (1901–1994), Austrian-born British film actor
Friedrich Schiller (1759–1805), German poet and dramatist
Harvey Schiller (born 1940), American sports executive
Heinz Schiller (1930–2007), Swiss Formula One driver
Herbert Schiller (1919–2000), American sociologist
Julian "Jules" Schiller, Australian TV and radio personality
Julius Schiller (c. 1580–1627), German astronomer
Karl Schiller (1911–1994), German economist and politician
Keith Schiller (born c. 1959), American former law enforcement official and security consultant who served as Deputy Assistant to U.S. President Donald Trump and Director of Oval Office Operations
Lawrence Schiller (born 1936), American film director and producer
Leif Schiller (1939–2007), Danish photographer
Leon Schiller de Schildenfeld (1887–1954), Polish director and critic
Margrit Schiller (born 1948), German former member of the Red Army Faction
Martin Schiller (Born 1982), Austrian basketball coach
Mathieu Schiller (1979–2011), French bodyboarder, shark attack victim
Mayer Schiller (born 1951), American rabbi
Patricia Schiller (1913–2018), American lawyer, clinical psychologist and sex educator
Patrick Schiller (born 1988), American football linebacker
Phil Schiller (Philip W. Schiller), a senior vice-president at Apple Inc.
Rob Schiller, American television director and producer.
Solomon Marcus Schiller-Szinessy (1820–1890), Hungarian rabbi
Thomas James "TJ" Schiller (born 1986), Canadian freestyle skier
Tom Schiller, American screenwriter, son of Bob Schiller
Vivian Schiller (born 1961), American media executive
Wilton Schiller (1919–2014), American producer and screenwriter

Fictional entities
Leland Schiller, fictional character in The Messengers TV series

See also 
 Shiller (disambiguation)
 Schilling

German-language surnames
Surnames from nicknames